Stephen Dami Mamza (born 30 November 1969) is a Nigerian Roman Catholic bishop.

Mamza was born in Bazza, Adamawa and was ordained to the priesthood on 13 April 1996. On 18 February 2011, he was appointed bishop of the Roman Catholic Diocese of Yola and ordained as bishop on 7 April 2011.

References

External links

1969 births
Living people
People from Adamawa State
21st-century Roman Catholic bishops in Nigeria
Roman Catholic bishops of Yola